William Beal Pritchett  (31 January 1921 – 28 January 2014) was a senior Australian public servant. He was Secretary of the Department of Defence between 1979 and 1984.

Early life and education
Bill Pritchett was born on 31 January 1921. He attended the Sydney Church of England Grammar School. Pritchett studied for a Bachelor of Arts degree at Sydney University, studying in history and anthropology.

Career 
Pritchett served in World War II and then before joining the Commonwealth Public Service in 1945 as a Cadet in the Department of External Affairs. His first overseas post was to Indonesia, during the country's struggle for independence from the Netherlands.

In 1965, Pritchett was appointed Australia High Commissioner to newly independent Singapore. In 1973, Pritchett was recruited to the Defence Department by his former boss in External Affairs, Arthur Tange.

From 1978 to 1979, Pritchett was the Deputy Secretary for Strategy and Intelligence. He was later appointed Secretary of the Defence Department when Tange retired in 1979. During his time as departmental head, Pritchett worked to improve the departmental culture.

Pritchett retired from the public service in 1984.

Awards and honours
In January 1984 Pritchett was made an Officer of the Order of Australia for his public service.

References

1921 births
2014 deaths
High Commissioners of Australia to India
Ambassadors of Australia to Nepal
High Commissioners of Australia to Singapore
Officers of the Order of Australia
University of Sydney alumni
Secretaries of the Australian Department of Defence
Australian expatriates in Indonesia